The Raiders are a team of three fictional characters appearing in American comic books published by Marvel Comics. The Raiders first appear in Iron Man #145 (Apr. 1981) and was created by David Michelinie and Bob Layton.

Publication history 
The Raiders first feature in the title Iron Man, when they suddenly appear during a technology trade show and cause property damage until the arrival of the hero Iron Man. The trio skirmish with Iron Man for a moment, with one of the Raiders using acid to damage the hero's armor. During a second battle at a live boxing match, Iron Man defeats all three Raiders. The trio are revealed to be the employees of Edwin Cord, a corporate rival of Tony Stark (Iron Man's alter ego). Cord knew that Iron Man, as Stark's bodyguard, would follow him to the trade show, and used this opportunity to demonstrate the capabilities of the Raider suits for covert organisation S.H.I.E.L.D. The character, however, is arrested by S.H.I.E.L.D agents for his irresponsible actions.

The Raiders reappear, with upgraded suits, during the Armor Wars storyline in the title Iron Man. Tony Stark discovers his armor designs have been stolen and decides to retrieve or neutralize the technology, leading to a brief confrontation with the Raiders, in which their suits are rendered defunct.

The Raiders were later part of an army of armor-wearing mercenaries hired to attack Stark Enterprises.

The characters reappear in the second volume of The Invincible Iron Man and confront Iron Man once again.

Powers and abilities
Each of the Raider suits provide the wearer with greater durability and flight, and offer varying weapons systems. "Raider 1" is equipped with wristbands that can generate bullets; acid and lasers; "Raider 2" is equipped with a net capable of syphoning energy and a protective shield that absorbs energy attacks and "Raider 3" has two wrist weapons that project and amplify sonic waves in concentrated form.

Other media

Television
 The Raiders were set to appear in Iron Man: Armored Adventures, had the show gotten a third season.

Film
 The Raiders make an appearance in the anime film Iron Man: Rise of Technovore, as thugs hired by Ezekiel Stane and Sasha Hammer. Unlike the comics, the Raiders do not have individualized weapons in their armors.

Miscellaneous
 The Raiders appeared in an official comic taking place just prior to the events of The Avengers. The Marvel Cinematic Universe version of Raiders were hired by a Saudi businessman to defeat Iron Man in a race around Dubai. Their armors were stated to be high-tech gliders provided by the Global Incorporated company, but Iron Man dismissed them as cheap knock-offs.

References

Characters created by Bob Layton
Characters created by David Michelinie
Comics characters introduced in 1981
Marvel Comics supervillain teams